Ballwin is a southwestern suburb of St. Louis, located in St. Louis County, Missouri, United States. The population was 31,103 as of the 2020 census.

History
Ballwin was established in 1837.  The community was named for John Ball, who settled at the town site in 1804. A post office called Ballwin has been in operation since 1866.

Geography
Ballwin is located at  (38.594820, −90.548420).

Demographics

2020 census
As of the 2020 Census, there were 31,103 people and 11,922 households living in the city. The racial makeup of the city was 81.1% White, 3.0% African American, 0.2% Native American, 8.8% Asian, 1.0% other races, and 5.8% two or more races. Hispanic or Latino of any race were 3.1% of the population.

2010 census
As of the census of 2010, there were 30,404 people, 11,874 households, and 8,631 families living in the city. The racial makeup of the city was 89.3% White, 2.5% African American, 0.2% Native American, 5.6% Asian, 0.6% from other races, and 1.7% from two or more races. Hispanic or Latino of any race were 2.4% of the population.

There were 11,874 households, of which 34.2% had children under the age of 18 living with them, 60.9% were married couples living together, 15% had a female householder with no husband present, 3.0% had a male householder with no wife present, and 27.3% were non-families. 23.1% of all households were made up of individuals, and 9.4% had someone living alone who was 65 years of age or older. The average household size was 2.56 and the average family size was 3.04.

The median age in the city was 41.2 years. 24.9% of residents were under the age of 18; 6.8% were between the ages of 18 and 24; 23.7% were from 25 to 44; 29.5% were from 45 to 64; and 15.1% were 65 years of age or older. The gender makeup of the city was 48.2% male and 51.8% female.

2000 census
As of the census of 2000, there were 31,283 people, 11,797 households, and 8,942 families living in the city. The racial makeup of the city was 75.39% White, 10.50% African American, 0.22% Native American, 5.27% Asian, 0.04% Pacific Islander, 0.51% from other races, and 1.07% from two or more races. Hispanic or Latino of any race were 1.86% of the population.

There were 11,797 households, out of which 37.2% had children under the age of 18 living with them, 65.6% were married couples living together, 8.0% had a female householder with no husband present, and 24.2% were non-families. 20.6% of all households were made up of individuals, and 7.3% had someone living alone who was 65 years of age or older. The average household size was 2.65 and the average family size was 3.09.

In the city, the population was spread out, with 27.0% under the age of 18, 6.4% from 18 to 24, 29.9% from 25 to 44, 24.5% from 45 to 64, and 12.1% who were 65 years of age or older. The median age was 38 years. For every 100 females, there were 94.2 males. For every 100 females age 18 and over, there were 91.6 males.

The median income for a household in the city was $66,458 and the median income for a family was $77,021 (these figures had risen to $76,931 and $94,989 respectively as of a 2007 estimate). Males had a median income of $56,056 versus $32,202 for females. The per capita income for the city was $29,520. About 2.0% of families and 3.2% of the population were below the poverty line, including 3.1% of those under age 18 and 3.7% of those age 65 or over.

Education
Ballwin is home to many schools within the Parkway School District, including Parkway West High School, and Claymont, Henry, Oak Brook, and Sorrento Springs elementary schools.

Ballwin also contains several schools within the Rockwood School District, including Selvidge Middle School, Ballwin, Westridge, and Woerther elementary schools.

Holy Infant School is a Catholic private school in Ballwin that includes Pre-K through Eighth Grade.

Business
Lion's Choice, a roast beef fast food chain, was founded in Ballwin.

Religion
Several Churches, Mosques and Synagogues exist in the city.

Salem in Ballwin United Methodist Church is located along Manchester Road, in the heart of Ballwin. The church was founded in 1846 by Brother H. Hohmann, a German immigrant involved with the German Methodist Episcopal Church. The original church was built in 1870, and traditional Methodist services are still conducted each Sunday inside. During 21st century renovations, a sign was discovered within the church that is thought to have hung within the original 1870 church, which reads: "ehre sei gott in der höhe," meaning "Glory to God in the highest." The sign was once again hung up in the church and can be found at the rear of the sanctuary. Despite its small size, the church is involved in assisting an orphanage located in South Africa.

Parks and Recreation
Vlasis Park is the largest park in Ballwin. It is  located North of Manchester Road between Seven Trails Dr., Ball Park Drive, and Holloway Road. Vlasis Park covers 31 acres and features a baseball diamond, a playground, four tennis courts, restrooms, two ponds (one of which is stocked with fish), two pavilions, a walking path, and a sand volleyball court. Vlasis Park is the location of the annual Ballwin Days Festival.

Ballwin is also home to New Ballwin Park, Ferris Park, Greenfield Commons, and Holloway Park.

The Pointe at Ballwin Commons hosts an indoor pool and fitness center. The North Pointe Aquatic Center is an outdoor pool open only during the summer. Adjacent to the North Pointe is the Ballwin Golf Course.

References

External links
 City of Ballwin

Cities in St. Louis County, Missouri
Cities in Missouri
1837 establishments in Missouri
Populated places established in 1837